Chamamé (Guarani for: party, disorder) is a folk music genre from Northeast Argentina and Argentinian Mesopotamia. In 2020, Chamamé was inscribed in UNESCO's Intangible cultural heritage list after it was nominated by Argentina in 2018. 

Chamamé is also a traditional musical style appreciated in borders zone of South America, as Paraguay, Uruguay and Brazil, mainly in the South Region of Brazil (Rio Grande do Sul, Santa Catarina and Paraná) and Mato Grosso do Sul.

Jesuit reductions in the area encouraged cultural growth that lasted until the Jesuits were expelled by the Spanish Crown in the late 18th century. Within this area, Yapeyú, Corrientes was a centre of musical culture that many point to as the birthplace of the original Chamamé. Further mixing with instruments such as the Spanish guitar, then the violin and the accordion, finally resulted in what is currently known as "Chamamé". There are recordings of Chamamé dating back to the early 20th century, and the term 'Chamamé' was already used in 1931; this type of music, prior to that, was often referred to as the Corrientes Polka.

The Chamamé, originally schottische brought by the Volga German immigrants, has considerable Guaraní influence, mixed with the Spanish guitar and the European accordion from those immigrants that arrived in the area at the beginning of the 20th century.

Among chamamé figures of note are Teresa Parodi, Tránsito Cocomarola and Chango Spasiuk.

See also
 Music of Argentina
 Schottische
 Jenkka

References

External links
Fundacionmemoriadelchamame.com  (La Pagina Oficial de La Fundación Memoria del Chamamé)
Chamame.tv  (La Pagina Oficial de La Fiesta Nacional del Chamamé, Argentina)
Chamigos.com  (Chamame Social Network)
SiempreChamame.com.ar  (Chamamé site and online radio)
Corrientes Chamamé 

20th-century music genres
Argentine styles of music
Argentine dances
Dance in Argentina
Polka derivatives